Kvabebihyrax kachethicus is an extinct hyrax from the Pliocene of the Caucasus.

With a length of 1.6 metres (5 ft 4 in), Kvabebihyrax was much larger than modern hyraxes, comparable in size to larger species of the Paleogene genus Titanohyrax. Its robust body and eyes placed high on the skull gave it a hippopotamus-like appearance. It also had large pairs of incisors in both jaws.

References

Prehistoric hyraxes
Pliocene mammals of Europe
Piacenzian genus extinctions
Prehistoric placental genera
Fossil taxa described in 1966